Ushcher is a rural locality (a selo) in Vladimir, Vladimir Oblast, Russia. The population was 1 as of 2010. There is 1 street.

Geography 
Ushcher is located 23 km east of Vladimir. Shirmanikha is the nearest rural locality.

References 

Rural localities in Vladimir Urban Okrug